This List of alumni of Notre Dame College, includes graduates, non-graduate former students and current students of Notre Dame College, Dhaka, Bangladesh.

Government and law

Current ministers

Other politicians

Diplomats

Military

Academia and research

Educators

Scientists, inventors and researchers

Business

Entertainment

Journalists and media personalities

Literature and writing

Mountaineer

Religion

Sports

Other

References

External links 
 Official website of Notre Dame College, Dhaka
 Notre Dame College alumni association in Australia
 Club Notredamians Bangladesh Limited

Alumni
Notre Dame College, Alumni
Lists of people by university or college in Bangladesh
Lists of people by school affiliation